In inorganic chemistry, metal–metal bonds describe attractive interactions between metal centers.  The simplest examples are found in bimetallic complexes.  Metal–metal bonds can be "supported", i.e. be accompanied by one or more bridging ligands, or "unsupported".  They can also vary according to bond order. The topic of metal–metal bonding is usually discussed within the framework of coordination chemistry, but the topic is related to extended metallic bonding, which describes interactions between metals in extended solids such as bulk metals and metal subhalides.

Unsupported metal–metal bonds
The premier example of a complex with an unsupported metal–metal bond is dimanganese decacarbonyl, Mn2(CO)10. Many metal clusters contain several unsupported M–M bonds.  Some examples are M3(CO)12 (M = Ru, Os) and Ir4(CO)12.

A subclass of unsupported metal–metal bonded arrays are linear chain compounds.  In such cases the M–M bonding is weak as signaled by longer M–M bonds and the tendency of such compounds to dissociate in solution.

Supported metal–metal bonds
An early example of a supported metal–metal bond is cyclopentadienyliron dicarbonyl dimer, [(C5H5)Fe(CO)2]2.  In the predominant isomers of this complex, the two Fe centers are joined not only by an Fe–Fe bond, but also by bridging CO ligands.  The related cyclopentadienylruthenium dicarbonyl dimer features an unsupported Ru–Ru bond. Many metal clusters contain several supported M–M bonds.  Some examples are Fe3(CO)12 and Co4(CO)12.

Multiple metal–metal bonds

In addition to M–M single bonds, metal pairs can be linked by double, triple, quadruple, and in a few cases, quintuple bonds. Isolable complexes with multiple bonds are most common among the transition metals in the middle of the d-block, such as rhenium, tungsten, technetium, molybdenum and chromium. Typical the coligands are π-donors, not π-acceptors.  Well studied examples are the tetraacetates, such as dimolybdenum tetraacetate (quadruple bond) and dirhodium tetraacetate (single bond).  Mixed-valence druthenium tetraacetates have fractional M–M bond orders, i.e., 2.5 for [Ru2(OAc)4(H2O)2]+.

The complexes Nb2X6(SR2)3 adopt a face-sharing bioctahedral structures (X = Cl, Br; SR2 = thioether). As dimers of Nb(III), they feature double metal–metal bonds, the maximum possible for a pair of metals with d2 configuration. 
Hexa(tert-butoxy)ditungsten(III) is a well studied example of a complex with a metal–metal triple bond.

References

Cluster chemistry